The Anglican Church of St Mary in Chedzoy, Somerset, England dates from the 13th century and has been designated as a grade I listed building.

There is evidence of a Church in Chedzoy in 1166 when it was given along with the parent church in North Petherton to Buckland Priory. The tower dates from the early 16th century when the porch, clerestory, the arch into the north transept, and the windows in the north aisle were added.

Much of the current building is from the 17th century, although the Norman chancel, chancel arch and doorway remain. It was extensively remodelled by William Butterfield in 1861. A late medieval screen and rood loft were removed around 1841. The font has survived since the 13th century. The pulpit is from the 16th century. Amongst the memorials is a brass believed to commemorate Richard Sydenham who died in 1499.

Local tradition says that the church still bears marks form the forces of the Duke of Monmouth during the Monmouth Rebellion who sharpened their swords before battle, however this is unlikely to be the true source of the marks.

The parish is part of the benefice of Westonzoyland with Chedzoy within the Sedgemoor deanery.

See also
 Grade I listed buildings in Sedgemoor
 List of Somerset towers
 List of ecclesiastical parishes in the Diocese of Bath and Wells

References

External links
 St. Mary's Church, Chedzoy website
 Chedzoy Parish Council website

13th-century church buildings in England
Church of England church buildings in Sedgemoor
Grade I listed churches in Somerset
Grade I listed buildings in Sedgemoor